Zeuzera lineata is a moth in the family Cossidae. It was described by Max Gaede in 1933. It is found in Malaysia, Vietnam and on Sumatra.

References

Zeuzerinae
Moths described in 1933
Taxa named by Max Gaede